Burn Witch Burn is a Philadelphia-based Celtic rock band.

Burn Witch Burn may also refer to:

 Burn Witch Burn (film), a 1962 horror film known outside of America as Night of the Eagle
 Burn Witch Burn! (novel), a 1932 novel by Abraham Merritt
 "Burn, Witch. Burn!" (American Horror Story), a 2013 episode of American Horror Story: Coven

See also
Burn the Witch (disambiguation)